The Kuoyka or Kuoika is a river in Yakutia (Sakha Republic), Russian Federation. The Kuoyka flows north of the Arctic Circle across a lonely, desolate area of the Olenyoksky District devoid of settlements.

The name of the river comes from the Nganasan word "kuoika", (куойка), meaning a household deity.

Course  
The Kuoika is a left tributary of the Olenyok. Its sources are at the limit of the Northern Siberian Lowland, off the northeastern end of the Central Siberian Plateau. It flows roughly eastwards to the southwest and south of the Beyenchime in an area with numerous lakes. In its last stretch the Kuoika turns in a SSE direction entering the Central Siberian Plateau area. It meanders strongly in its southernmost section within a wide gorge until it meets the left bank of the Olenyok  from its mouth.

The river is frozen between early October and early June.

Quote
The last, tortuous stretch of the river was described in such terms by Yuri Tsenin in Vokrug sveta:

See also
List of rivers of Russia

References

External links 
Fishing & Tourism in Yakutia
Якутия 2014 (Лена, Оленек, Куойка, Беенчиме)

Rivers of the Sakha Republic
Central Siberian Plateau
North Siberian Lowland
Tributaries of the Olenyok